The 2007 Ivy League Baseball Championship Series took place at Murray Stadium in Providence, Rhode Island on May 5, 2007.  The series matched the regular season champions of each of the league's two divisions.  , the winner of the series, claimed the Ivy League's automatic berth in the 2007 NCAA Division I baseball tournament.  It was Brown's first Championship Series victory and their first appearance.

Penn made their third appearance in the Championship Series, having also won 1995 and finished as runner up in 1994.

Results

References

Ivy League Baseball Championship Series
Tournament
Ivy League Baseball Championship Series